Ana Drev (born 6 August 1985) is a Slovenian World Cup alpine ski racer. She specializes in the giant slalom and started her first European Cup race at age 15 on February 24, 2001, in Rogla, Slovenia.

Drev made her World Cup debut in October 2001 at age 16. She debuted at the Winter Olympic Games in 2006, at age 20, finishing 9th in giant slalom.

In season 2016 she finished as seventh in giant slalom ranking, achieving two podiums in World Cup, the first of her career. Ranked among the greatest Slovenian giant slalom skiers, Drev's career was plagued by health problems and instability in her national team, which didn't allow her to live up to her potentiality. She retired in February 2020, after suffering an injury in December 2018.

Career

2016 season
Drev started the 2015–16 FIS Alpine Ski World Cup well, leading in the giant slalom, before Lara Gut and Eva-Maria Brem, by the end of December, after performing "sensationally" in Lienz. This was followed by a second place in Flachau on 17 January 2016 and another second place in Maribor two weeks later, on 30 January 2016. However, the championship was eventually won by Eva-Maria Brem, with Drev finishing 7th in the discipline

2017 Season
Drev finished the 2016–17 FIS Alpine Ski World Cup season 8th in giant slalom. That year she also participated in the FIS Alpine World Ski Championships 2017, finishing 7th.

2018 season
Drev finished 9th in giant slalom in the 2017–18 FIS Alpine Ski World Cup.

Ana Drev is frequently ranked as one of the greatest Slovenian giant slalom skiers.

Drev last competed on December 28, 2018, in the World Cup. In her last race she suffered an injury and during her rehabilitation contemplated retiring. Finally, in February 2020, after 18 years in the World Cup, she announced her retirement.

It has been stated that Drev, a talented skier, would've achieved much more than two podiums in the World Cup if she hadn't been impeded by a series of injuries and health problems and problems within the Slovenian national team. Drev expressed regret at not having lived up to her potentiality, stating that she was especially disappointed with her results at the 2018 Winter Olympics in Pyongyang, where she felt she could get a medal.

World Cup results

Season standings

◇ injured during the season

Race podiums
 2 podiums – (2 GS)

World Championship results

Olympic results

References

External links
 
 Ana Drev World Cup standings at the International Ski Federation
 
 
 Völkl Skis  – team – Ana Drev

1985 births
Living people
Sportspeople from Slovenj Gradec
Slovenian female alpine skiers
Olympic alpine skiers of Slovenia
Alpine skiers at the 2006 Winter Olympics
Alpine skiers at the 2010 Winter Olympics
Alpine skiers at the 2018 Winter Olympics